Expedition Robinson 2003, was the seventh version of Expedition Robinson, or Survivor as it is referred to in some countries, to air in Sweden and it aired in 2003. Along with the twenty four official contestants, there was a twenty fifth contestant, Hildegard Krebbs who was forced to leave the competition in its pre-production stage. As this season was initially thought to be the show's last, the major twist for season was that it was to be an "Allstars" theme in which a tribe of former contestants known as the "Veterans", would take on a team of newcomers known as the "Challengers". Another twist was added midway through the pre-merge stage of the competition, a pair twist. As part of the pair twist the contestants were grouped, competed, and voted out in pairs, however following their initial elimination the two members of the pair would compete in a duel, the winner of which would stay secluded from most of the other contestants on an island, known as "Utopia", in order to compete in a series of duels to re-enter the competition. Throughout the post-merge duration of the game, contestants, both in the game and in Utopia, would continuously swap locations based on challenge results. As a final twist eight more votes would be distributed among the two finalists based on the percent they received in a public poll. In the end, Emma Andersson won the season with a jury vote of 11–5 over Mille Lansburgh. Andersson received six of the eight public votes having garnered seventy five percent of the vote.

Finishing order

Voting history

 All pairs voted for one non-veteran player that they wanted to eliminate. As Mikael received the most votes, both he and Sylvia were eliminated. Following the vote, Mikael and Sylvia faced off in a duel, the winner of which would stay in Utopia while the loser would be eliminated.
 At the fourth tribal council, initially only challengers could vote to eliminate another challenger player. Due to a tie, the veterans voted as well. As Vincent received the most votes, both he and Mia were eliminated. Following the vote, Mia and Vincent faced off in a duel, the winner of which would stay in Utopia while the loser would be eliminated.
 At the fifth tribal council, only the challengers could vote to eliminate another challenger player. As Råå received the most votes, both she and Martin were eliminated. Following the vote, Martin and Råå faced off in a duel, the winner of which would stay in Utopia while the loser would be eliminated.
 At the sixth tribal council, initially only challengers could vote to eliminate another challenger player. Due to a tie, the veterans voted as well. As Daniel received the most votes, both he and Zübeyde were eliminated. Following the vote, Camilla decided to leave the show and Zübeyde refused the duel so Daniel returned to the South team.
 At the eighth tribal council, Pål could not vote as he was being punished for breaking a rule.
 As a twist, following the tenth tribal council vote it was revealed that the person who received the most votes would have the sole vote to eliminate.
 In episode twelve, all contestants left in Utopia competed in a final duel for a spot in the final five.
 As a final twist, along with the eight jury votes cast by the jury members the Swedish public was allowed to vote for who they wanted to win. The percentage of votes each of the finalists received would then be split up amongst the two as eight jury votes

References
Footnotes

Sources

External links
Expedition: Robinson i SVT 1997-2003
http://wwwc.aftonbladet.se/noje/tv/doku/2002/robinson/robinson.html
https://web.archive.org/web/20101021101353/http://svt.se/2.4145/1.81638/emma_andersson?lid=puff_83105&lpos=lasMer
https://web.archive.org/web/20121006014137/http://hem.passagen.se/aotvdenise/

 2003
2003 Swedish television seasons